The Yangtze Plain (Chinese: 長江中下游平原/长江中下游平原; Wade-Giles: Ch'ang Chiang P'ing-yüan; Pinyin: Chang Jiang Pingyuan) is made up of a series of alluvial plains of along the Yangtze River and its major tributaries.

The  Yangtze Plain starts east of Yichang (Hubei province), China. The Middle Yangtze Plain is made up of parts of the north-eastern and south-eastern Hunan, Hubei, and north-central Jiangxi provinces, and includes the Dongting, Poyang, and Hong lakes.

The Middle-Lower Yangtze Plain stretches eastward from Mount Wu to the coast. It is made up of alluvial deposits from the Yangtze River and its tributaries. The plain is somewhat swampy, made up of many lakes and rivers, making it suitable for rice growing and freshwater fish, and it is therefore known as the "land of fish and rice".  The area also produces tea, silk, rapeseed, broad beans, and tangerines.

The Lower Yangtze Plain includes the Yangtze River Delta.

See also
 Jiangnan

References
"Land and Resources" — Chinese Embassy in Sweden Web pages (retrieved 9 February 2006)
"Natural Condition" — China Facts and Figures 2005 (retrieved 9 February 2006)

Plains of China
Yangtze River
Landforms of Hubei
Landforms of Hunan
Landforms of Jiangxi
Central China